Unleash the Dragon is the debut solo studio album by American R&B singer Sisqó of Dru Hill, released on November 30, 1999, on Def Soul. Sisqó recorded the album during Dru Hill's hiatus. It includes the hit songs "Got to Get It", "Incomplete", and "Thong Song". Previously, Sisqo had been the lead singer of the group Dru Hill. Recorded under Island Records, the group released two multi-platinum albums to date: Dru Hill (1996) and Enter the Dru (1998). In 2003, the album was certified quintuple platinum by the Recording Industry Association of America (RIAA) for shipment of five million copies in the United States.

The album also garnered Sisqó two American Music Award nominations for Favorite Soul/R&B Album and Favorite Soul/R&B Male Artist. In addition he received three nominations including Best New Artist and Best R&B Album at the 43rd Grammy Awards in 2001.

Critical reception

Allmusic editor Michael Gallucci wrote that "loaded with whispered bedroom moans, which have become late-'90s R&B clichés, Unleash the Dragon is short on any real songs to justify the pointless replay of these familiar grooves [...] Once the beats – which borrow heavily from the contemporary R&B playbook – are programmed, there's little for Sisqó to do but coast along the grooves, with all the conviction and commitment of a soul robot."

Track listing
Credits taken from the album's liner notes.

Notes
 denotes co-producer

Charts

Weekly charts

Year-end charts

Certifications

References

1999 debut albums
Sisqó albums
Def Jam Recordings albums
Albums produced by Tim & Bob
Albums recorded at Metalworks Studios